The Pantellerian shrew (Crocidura cossyrensis) is a species of mammal in the family Soricidae. It is endemic to Italy.

References

Mammals of Europe
Crocidura
Endemic fauna of Italy
Mammals described in 1989
Taxonomy articles created by Polbot
Taxobox binomials not recognized by IUCN